

Results

Green denotes finalists

References

Men's 3 metre springboard